Donald Payne (born July 12, 1994) is an American football linebacker for the Arlington Renegades of the XFL. He played college football at Stetson and was signed by the Baltimore Ravens as an undrafted free agent in 2017 as the first player from Stetson to play in the NFL. He has also played for the Jacksonville Jaguars, the Washington Football Team, the Miami Dolphins and the San Francisco 49ers.

College career 
Payne finished his college career as a three-time All-American and a three-time Pioneer Football League Defensive Player of the Year, the first PFL athlete to win the award three times during their career. In his first season at Stetson, Payne was named the 2013 Pioneer Football League Defensive Freshman of the Year. In his sophomore season, Payne led the entire NCAA with 185 total tackles on the year and at the time tied an all-time all-division NCAA record with 30 total tackles in the win over Campbell University. Payne recorded 538 career tackles, which is the 3rd most in Division 1 history, 14 sacks and 9 interceptions during his collegiate career. Donald Payne was inducted into the Stetson University Athletics Hall of Fame on October 29, 2022.

Professional career

Baltimore Ravens 
Payne signed with the Baltimore Ravens as an undrafted free agent on May 5, 2017. He was waived on September 2, 2017.

Jacksonville Jaguars 
On September 3, 2017, Payne was claimed off waivers by the Jacksonville Jaguars. The Jaguars advanced all the way to the AFC Championship where they lost to the New England Patriots, 20-24. Payne finished the season third in the NFL in special teams tackles with 16. On October 25, 2018, Payne was placed on injured reserve with a knee injury. He was activated off injured reserve on December 28, 2018. On May 9, 2019, the Jaguars waived Payne.

Baltimore Ravens (second stint) 
On August 16, 2019, Payne signed with the Baltimore Ravens. He was waived on August 31, 2019 and was signed to the practice squad the next day. He was released on September 10.

Jacksonville Jaguars (second stint) 
On October 22, 2019, Payne was signed by the Jacksonville Jaguars.
In week 13 against the Tampa Bay Buccaneers, Payne recorded a team high 13 tackles and sacked Jameis Winston once in the 28–11 win. Payne was also featured on NFL’s mic’d up in week 15 vs. the Oakland Raiders. The Jaguars won 20-16, the last Raiders game ever played in the Oakland Coliseum before they relocated to Las Vegas. Payne finished the 2019 season playing in nine games (five starts) and registered 61 tackles, a sack, a pass defense and a fumble recovery.

Washington Football Team 
Payne signed with the Washington Football Team on July 28, 2020. He was waived on September 5, 2020, and signed to the practice squad the next day. He was released on October 26.

Miami Dolphins
On November 11, 2020, Payne was signed to the Miami Dolphins' practice squad. He was released on November 23, 2020.

San Francisco 49ers
On August 11, 2021, Payne signed a one-year contract with the San Francisco 49ers, but was waived a few days later.

Houston Gamblers 
Payne was selected by the Houston Gamblers in the inaugural 2022 USFL draft. On May 31, 2022, he was named the USFL Defensive Player of the Week in Week 7. In Week 10, Payne was again named the USFL Defensive Player of the Week in the final regular season game. Payne lead the USFL in tackles with 117 tackles in 10 games. He was named to inaugural All-USFL Team Defense.

Arlington Renegades
The Arlington Renegades selected Payne in the third round of the 2023 XFL Supplemental Draft on January 1, 2023.

Spring League Statistics

References

External links
 
 Washington Football Team bio

1994 births
Living people
People from Fayetteville, Georgia
Sportspeople from the Atlanta metropolitan area
Players of American football from Georgia (U.S. state)
American football linebackers
Stetson Hatters football players
Baltimore Ravens players
Jacksonville Jaguars players
Washington Football Team players
Miami Dolphins players
San Francisco 49ers players
Houston Gamblers (2022) players
Arlington Renegades players